Design Academy Eindhoven is an interdisciplinary educational institute for art, architecture and design in Eindhoven, Netherlands. The work of its faculty and alumni have brought it international recognition, and is widely regarded as one of the world’s leading design schools.

History

The Design Academy Eindhoven was established in 1947 and was originally named the Academie voor Industriële Vormgeving (AIVE). The first nine students graduated in 1955. In 1997, the Academy moved into "De Witte Dame" (The White Lady) building and subsequently changed its name to Design Academy Eindhoven (DAE). In 1999, Li Edelkoort, was elected chairwoman of the Academy. In 2009 she left the Design Academy to pursue personal projects and was replaced by Anne Mieke Eggenkamp as chair. She was in turn succeeded by Thomas Widdershoven from 2013 until September 2016. Since 2017, Joseph Grima has taken place as CD.

Structure

The bachelor's program is split into eight interdisciplinary departments, broadly covering art, architecture, fashion design, graphic design and industrial design. As the structure of the bachelor's program is intended to be flexible, students are free to move between departments and all students graduate with the same degree, a Bachelor of Design.

The DAE also offers five distinct master's programs: MA Contextual Design, MA Social Design, MA Information Design, MA Geo-Design and MA the Critical Inquiry Lab (former Design Curating and Writing).

International Reputation

The Design Academy Eindhoven's (DAE) emphasis on engaging complex social and cultural issues has gained it an international reputation. The Dutch collective Droog Design features several DAE alumni, Orange Alert organizes exhibitions and events of DAE students work in New York and several DAE alumni have been nominated for the "Designer of the Year" awards at the Design Museum in London.The book House of Concepts: Design Academy Eindhoven tells the 60-year history of the academy, outlining how many significant Dutch artists, architects and designers have been associated with the DAE.

In 2022, the Design Academy Eindhoven was placed joint 9th in the art and design subject area in the QS World University Rankings published by Quacquarelli Symonds, with an overall score of 81.6/100.

Events
Every year, in the fall, the Dutch Design Week is held in Eindhoven with an array of Design-related events.  These include the graduation exhibit (featuring the works of that year's graduates of the DAE) and the Dutch Design Awards.

Associated people

Faculty 

 Gijs Bakker
 Jan Boelen
 Kees Bol
 Ilse Crawford
 Jan Gregoor
 Catelijne van Middelkoop
 Marina Otero Verzier
 Satyendra Pakhale
 Louise Schouwenberg
 Saskia van Stein
 Pieter Stockmans
 The Stone Twins
 Alice Twemlow

Alumni

 Maarten Baas, designer
 Dror Benshetrit, designer
 Helen Berman, painter
 Joel Blanco, designer
 Tord Boontje, designer
 Susan Christianen, designer
 Els Coppens-van de Rijt, painter
 Camiel Fortgens, fashion designer
 Dave Hakkens, industrial designer
 Massoud Hassani, designer
 Richard Hutten, designer
 Hella Jongerius, designer
 Sabine Marcelis, artist and designer
 Eugène Peters, artist
 Willy Schmidhamer, artist
 Frans Schrofer, furniture designer
 Job Smeets, artist and designer
 Wieki Somers, designer
 Umi Dachlan, painter
 Ton van de Ven, creative director
 Marcel Wanders, designer
 Moon Seop Seo, designer
 Isak Berglund, designer

References

External links
 
 Dutch Design Events

Further reading
House of Concepts: Design Academy Eindhoven, Louise Schouwenberg, Gert Staal, Martijn Goedegebuure, eds.  (Amsterdam: Frame Publishers, 2008). 

 
Art schools in the Netherlands
Industrial design
Education in Eindhoven
1947 establishments in the Netherlands
Educational institutions established in 1947